William Tennent (1673–1746) was an American minister.

William Tennent may also refer to:

Related
William Tennent, Jr., son of William Tennent and predecessor to the Princeton theologians
William Tennent III (1740–1777), grandson of William Tennent and figure in South Carolina in the American Revolution
William Tennent High School, Bucks County, Pennsylvania school named for him

Others
William Tennent (cricketer) (1845–1883), English cricketer active in 1867 who played for Lancashire
William Blair Tennent, New Zealand politician

See also
William Tennant (disambiguation)